The 2010–11 season of the Belgian Pro League (also known as Jupiler Pro League for sponsorship reasons) is the 108th season of top-tier football in Belgium. It began on 30 July 2010 with the first match of the regular season and ended in May 2011 with the last matches of the playoff rounds. Anderlecht were the defending champions.

Changes from 2009–10
For the second time, a system of playoffs was used to determine the Belgian champions (contested by the top 6 teams after the regular season) and which teams would play in Europe the following season (teams ranked 7–14 playoff after the regular season with the winner entering a further playoff for the chance to 'steal' the European place of the lowest ranked team in the Top 6 playoff). In terms of relegation, a playoff was introduced between the 15th and 16th team after the regular season; those teams would play each other 5 times in a mini-league, with the team which finished fifteenth playing at home in matches 1, 3 and 5 and starting with a 3-point bonus. The loser of this playoff series would be relegated, whilst the winner would play the Second division relegation playoff with three teams from the Belgian Second Division for the chance to retain its place in first division.

Teams
On 28 December 2009, during the previous season, Mouscron went bankrupt and was immediately relegated. Roeselare ended the season in 15th place, forcing them to take part in the relegation playoffs. As they lost these playoffs they were also relegated and replaced by playoff winners Eupen. With this, Eupen became the first ever team from the German community to play at the highest level of Belgian football. Earlier, Belgian Second Division champions Lierse had been directly promoted.

Stadia and locations

Personnel and sponsoring

Managerial changes

During summer break

During regular season

During playoffs

Regular season

League table

Positions by round
Note: The classification was made after the weekend (or midweek) of each matchday, so postponed matches were only processed at the time they were played to represent the real evolution in standings. The postponed matches are:
 Matchday 15: Eupen vs. Mechelen of 13 November because of a flooded pitch, to be played on 18 January between matchdays 22 and 23.
 Matchday 17: Kortrijk vs. Lokeren of 27 November because of excessive rainfall and snow, to be played on 18 January between matchdays 22 and 23.
 Matchday 18: Charleroi vs. Cercle Brugge and Lierse vs. Mechelen of 4 December because of snow. The match Lierse vs. Mechelen is to be played on 15 February between matchdays 27 and 28, whereas on 21 December (between matchdays 20 and 21) the match Charleroi vs. Cercle Brugge has been awarded a 0–5 victory to Cercle Brugge as Charleroi did not "try everything possible to allow the match to be played". On 17 March, just two days before the final matchday, the decision is reversed as Charleroi had submitted a complaint at the BAS. BAS stands for the Belgian court of Arbitration of Sport, which is the Belgian version of the Court of Arbitration for Sport. As a result of this decision, Charleroi regained a chance of avoiding the relegation playoff, as they were only five points behind the 14th place, with two matches to play. Later that day, the decision is made to play the match on 23 March, which is unconventional as this meant that not all teams will play their final match on the same time.
 Matchday 20: Lokeren vs. Cercle Brugge and Sint-Truiden vs. Mechelen of 18 December were cancelled because of too many icy patches and/or snow on the pitch. The match between Lokeren and Cercle Brugge was rescheduled to be played on 2 February, between matchdays 24 and 25. On 28 December (between matchdays 21 and 22) Mechelen was awarded a 0–5 victory as Sint-Truiden did not provide proper playing conditions, however Sint-Truiden pressed charges for unfair treatment. The club was proven right in court and as a result the forfait became undone on 25 January (between matchdays 23 and 24) and the match was replayed on 23 February (between matchdays 27 and 28). The match Germinal Beerschot – Gent of 19 December was stopped after 10 minutes at a score of 0–0 because of excessive snowfall, it will be replayed on 16 February, between matchdays 26 and 27.
 Matchday 21: With the whole of Belgium suffering from excessive snow, several matches were cancelled, mostly because it was too dangerous to send thousands of supporters out on the slippery roads. Eupen vs. Zulte-Waregem, Charleroi vs. Germinal Beerschot, Westerlo vs. Lokeren and Mechelen vs. Kortrijk of 26 December were thus cancelled. The derby between Genk and Sint-Truiden of the 27th was also postponed. All of these matches were rescheduled to be played on 2 February, between matchdays 24 and 25, except Westerlo vs. Lokeren which was rescheduled to 16 February, between matchdays 26 and 27.
 Matchday 22: With a lot of roads still slippery in the south and east of Belgium, two more matches are cancelled: Standard vs. Mechelen of 29 December and Sint-Truiden vs. Cercle Brugge of 30 December. Both matches have been rescheduled to be played between matchdays 27 and 28, on 26 and 27 February respectively.

Results

Championship playoff
The points obtained during the regular season will be halved (and rounded up) before the start of the playoff. As a result, the teams started with the following points before the playoff: Anderlecht 33 points, Genk 32, Gent 29, Club Brugge 27, Lokeren 25 and Standard 25.5. In the event of ties at the end of the playoffs, the half point was deducted if it had been added. Anderlecht, Gent, Club Brugge and Standard received this type of bonus due to rounding.

Playoff table

Positions by round
Below the positions per round are shown. As teams did not all start with an equal number of points, the initial pre-playoffs positions are also given.

Results

Europa League Playoff
Mechelen, Westerlo, Cercle Brugge, Kortrijk, Zulte-Waregem, Sint-Truiden, Germinal Beerschot and Lierse qualified for the Europa League Playoffs.

Group A

Group B

Europa League playoff final
The winners of both playoff groups competed in a two-legged match. The winners on aggregate than will compete in another match (called Testmatch) against a team from the championship playoff (see below). If both teams are tied after two matches, the away goals rule will be applied. Should both teams still be tied afterwards, thirty minutes of extra time will be played and, if necessary, a penalty shootout will be conducted.

Westerlo won 5–2 on aggregate.

Testmatches Europa League
The fourth-placed team from the championship playoff and the winners of the Europa League playoff would have competed for one spot in the third qualifying round of the 2011–12 UEFA Europa League.

Before the match, both teams were already sure of qualification for European football. Westerlo because their opponent in the final of the 2010–11 Belgian Cup was Standard Liège, who were already qualified for the 2011–12 UEFA Champions League. Club Brugge because of their league position (4th). As a result, both teams agreed to drop the testmatches regardless of the result of the Belgian Cup final:
 Because Standard won the Belgian cup, Anderlecht will enter the Play-off round and Westerlo agreed to start in the Second qualifying round, giving Club Brugge the ticket to the Third qualifying round.

Relegation playoff
The teams finishing in the last two positions play each other 5 times. The team ending in 15th position starts with a three-point bonus and has three home matches.

Top goalscorers
In contrary to the previous season, which was the inaugural season with playoffs, the goals scored during the playoffs are valid to determine the league top scorer. As a result, Jelle Vossen, who was leading at the end of the regular season with 17 goals, still missed out on the top scorers' trophy.

Source: sporza.be and Sport.be  ''

Season statistics

Scoring
 Fastest goal in a match: 19 seconds –  Marvin Ogunjimi for Genk against Standard Liège (18 October 2010)
 Goal scored at the latest point in a match: 90+6 minutes –  Axel Witsel for Standard Liège against Kortrijk (17 December 2010).
 Winning goal scored at the latest point in a match: 90+5 minutes –  Adnan Čustović for Germinal Beerschot against Charleroi (11 September 2010).
 Widest winning margin: 7 goals
 Standard Liège 7–0 Lierse (27 November 2010).
 Most goals in a match by one team:  7 goals
 Standard Liège 7–0 Lierse (27 November 2010).
 Westerlo 7–1 Zulte Waregem (7 May 2011).
 Most goals in one half:  6 goals
 Gent 4–4 Westerlo (2–0 at half-time) (20 November 2010).
 Club Brugge 4–3 Westerlo (3–3 at half-time) (5 December 2010).
 Most goals in one half by a single team:  4 goals
 Anderlecht 4–1 Eupen (0–1 at half-time) (31 July 2010).
 Club Brugge 4–1 Sint-Truiden (4–1 at half-time) (7 August 2010).
 Genk 5–0 Charleroi (4–0 at half-time) (15 August 2010).
 Anderlecht 5–0 Mechelen (1–0 at half-time) (26 September 2010).
 Standard Liège 5–1 Anderlecht (1–0 at half-time) (3 October 2010).
 Eupen 6–0 Sint-Truiden (4–0 at half-time) (16 October 2010).
 Gent 4–4 Westerlo (2–0 at half-time) (20 November 2010).
 Standard Liège 7–0 Lierse (3–0 at half-time) (27 November 2010).
 Anderlecht 4–1 Charleroi (0–1 at half-time) (27 November 2010).
 Genk 5–1 Eupen (1–0 at half-time) (11 December 2010).
 Anderlecht 6–0 Lierse (2–0 at half-time) (26 December 2010).
 Eupen 4–2 Charleroi (0–2 at half-time) (16 April 2011).
 Westerlo 7–1 Zulte Waregem (4–0 at half-time) (7 May 2011).
 Most goals in a match by one player:  4 goals
  Ivan Perišić for Club Brugge against Charleroi (29 December 2010).

Discipline
 Card given at latest point in a game:  Victor Wanyama (yellow) at 90+9 minutes for Germinal Beerschot against Charleroi (10 September 2010).
 Most yellow cards in a single match: 10 – Standard Liège 3–3 Lokeren: 6 for Standard (Bolat, Pocognoli, Defour, Carcela, Witsel and Grozav), 4 for Lokeren (El Mouataz, Taravel, De Ceulaer and Leko) (14 August 2010)

See also
 List of Belgian football transfers summer 2010

References

Belgian Pro League seasons
Belgian
1